Papenhusen is a village and a former municipality in the Nordwestmecklenburg district, in Mecklenburg-Vorpommern, Germany. Since 25 May 2014, it is part of the municipality Stepenitztal.

References

Nordwestmecklenburg
Former municipalities in Mecklenburg-Western Pomerania